WASU-FM (90.5 FM) is a college radio station  broadcasting an alternative music format.  The station is owned by Appalachian State University in Boone, North Carolina, which is also the station's city of license. The station plays a college rock format and does a weekly news segment called App 1800 covering local issues. WASU is the winner of mtvU's "College Radio Woodie Award" for 2012, the "Shoulda Coulda Woodie Award" for 2011, and was a 2008 Finalist in the New York Festivals Radio Broadcasting Awards.

History
1972: Signed on with the first song being Beginnings by Chicago.

1978: Moves to Wey Hall.

2013: WASU begins broadcasting from the new George G. Beasley Media Complex with the song "I Will Wait" by Mumford & Sons. The last song played from Wey Hall is "Start Me Up" by The Rolling Stones.

Specialty shows
WASU has a variety of specialty shows that happen after 6pm. These shows allow for genres and shows that students produce to get on-air.

References
http://shouldacouldawoodie.mtvu.com/

External links

Appalachian State University
ASU-F
Watauga County, North Carolina
Radio stations established in 1972
1972 establishments in North Carolina